Amy Brierly  (born ) is a British female Paralympic sitting volleyball player. She is part of the Great Britain women's national sitting volleyball team.

She competed at the 2012 Summer Paralympics. On club level she played for FDSW Celtic Dragons in 2012.

See also
 Great Britain at the 2012 Summer Paralympics

References

External links
https://www.paralympic.org/results/historical
http://www.dailypost.co.uk/news/local-news/disability-sport-amy-brierly-sets-2747679
http://www.dailypost.co.uk/sport/other-sport/paralympics-deesides-amy-brierly-sitting-2654852
http://www.dailypost.co.uk/news/local-news/paralympics-2012-garden-citys-amy-2667573
http://www.baltimoresun.com/news/photos/bal-afp-getty-15133195420120906062541-photo.html
http://blonsky.photoshelter.com/image/I00001_Qmlq561a8
http://www.gettyimages.com/event/london-paralympics-day-8-sitting-volleyball-151312681#nicole-hill-of-great-britain-reaches-up-to-block-a-shot-during-the-picture-id151331804

1989 births
Living people
Volleyball players at the 2012 Summer Paralympics
Paralympic volleyball players of Great Britain
British sportswomen
British sitting volleyball players
Women's sitting volleyball players
Place of birth missing (living people)